Pincher Station, once known as Pincher City, is a hamlet in southern Alberta, Canada within the Municipal District of Pincher Creek No. 9. Previously an incorporated community, Pincher City dissolved from village status on May 3, 1932.

Demographics 

See also 
List of communities in Alberta
List of designated places in Alberta
List of former urban municipalities in Alberta
List of hamlets in Alberta

References 

Hamlets in Alberta
Designated places in Alberta
Municipal District of Pincher Creek No. 9